Paul Riley may refer to:

Paul Riley (actor) (born 1962), Scottish actor
Paul Riley (musician) (born 1951), British bassist and record producer
Paul Riley (footballer) (born 1963), footballer and coach
Paul Riley (cricketer) (born 1981), English cricketer
Paul Riley (The Bill), fictional character from TV show The Bill
Paul E. Riley (1942–2001), U.S. federal judge

See also
Paul Reilly (disambiguation)